The 1988 Cork Intermediate Football Championship was the 53rd staging of the Cork Intermediate Football Championship since its establishment by the Cork County Board in 1909. The draw for the opening round fixtures took place at the Cork Convention on 13 December 1987. The championship began on 7 May 1988 and ended on 11 September 1988.

On 11 September 1988, Kilshannig won the championship following a 2-09 to 1-07 defeat of Ballincollig in the final. This was their first ever championship title. It remains their only championship title in the grade.

Kilshannig's William O'Riordan was the championship's top scorer with 2-17.

Results

First round

Fermoy received a bye in this round.

Second round

Semi-finals

Final

Championship statistics

Top scorers

Top scorers overall

Top scorers in a single game

References

Cork Intermediate Football Championship